Guy Decomble (1910–1964) was a French film and television actor. A character actor he played in a number of supporting parts in postwar cinema. One of his better known roles is as the teacher in The 400 Blows by François Truffaut.

Selected filmography

 L'affaire est dans le sac (1932) - Le pasteur (uncredited)
 The Crime of Monsieur Lange (1936) - Typesetter (uncredited)
 The Citadel of Silence (1937) - (uncredited)
 Bizarre, Bizarre (1937) - Le maquereau (uncredited)
 The Cheat (1937) - Un joueur (uncredited)
 The Time of the Cherries (1938) - (uncredited)
 La Bête Humaine (1938) - Le garde-barrière (uncredited)
 The Trump Card (1942) - Un aspirant
 Strange Inheritance (1943) - Robert (uncredited)
 Madame et le mort (1943)
 Goodbye Leonard (1943) - Le rémouleur
 First on the Rope (1944) - Warfield
 Florence est folle (1944) - (uncredited)
 Farandole (1945)
 La Grande Meute (1945) - Maître Frouas
 François Villon (1945) - Denisot
 Hanged Man's Farm (1945) - Bénoni
 The Last Penny (1946) - Richard
 Song of the Clouds (1946)
 The Ideal Couple (1946) - Un opérateur
 Patrie (1946) - Un échevin
 Dreams of Love (1947) - Hurau
 Les jeux sont faits (1947) - Poulain
 La maison sous la mer (1947) - Lucien
 The Lost Village (1947) - Jean Pétrat
 Vire-vent (1949) - Justin
 Scandal on the Champs-Élysées (1949) - Pascaud
 Jour de fête (1949) - Roger
 Histoires extraordinaires (1949) - Le tueur obsédé
 The Winner's Circle (1950) - Émile
 Captain Ardant (1951) - Jossip
 The House on the Dune (1952)
 The Case Against X (1952)
 We Are All Murderers (1952) - Un inspecteur
 Ouvert contre X (1952) - Le concierge
 Les conquérants solitaires (1952) - (narration)
 Follow That Man (1953) - Emile Kortenwirth
 This Man Is Dangerous (1953) - Jacques le Dingue
 The Unfrocked One (1954) - Le père Mascle
 Dangerous Turning (1954) - M. Léon
 Black Dossier (1955) - L'inspecteur Leroy
 The Aristocrats (1955) - Gustave
 Les assassins du dimanche (1956) - Le brigadier
 Bob le flambeur (1956) - Le commissaire Ledru
 Maigret Sets a Trap (1958) - Mazet
 Thérèse Étienne (1958) - Rothlisberger
 Police judiciaire (1958) - L'inspecteur Mercier
 Les Naufrageurs (1959)
 Guinguette (1959)
 Les Cousins (1959) - Le libraire
 Archimède le clochard (1959) - Le chef de station de la RATP
 The 400 Blows (1959) - 'Petite Feuille' - l'instituteur
 Rue des prairies (1959) - Le père de Paul
 Nathalie, Secret Agent (1959) - Pageot
 The Old Guard (1960) - Le chauffeur du car
 The Nina B. Affair (1961) - Lofting
 Smrt na cukrovém ostrove (1962) - Jean
 The Girls of La Rochelle (1962) - Sire Basile
 Pourquoi Paris? (1962)
 Maigret Sees Red (1963) - Lognon

References

Bibliography
 Paietta, Ann C. (2007) Teachers in the Movies: A Filmography of Depictions of Grade School, Preschool and Day Care Educators, 1890s to the Present. McFarland.

External links

1910 births
1964 deaths
French male film actors
French male television actors